Telemaco may refer to:
Telêmaco Borba, a municipality in the state of Paraná, Brazil
 Telemaco (Scarlatti), a 1718 opera by Alessandro Scarlatti 
 Telemaco (Gluck), a 1765 opera by Christoph Willibald Gluck
 Telemaco (Sor), a 1797 opera by Sor
 Telemaco (Mayr), a 1797 opera by Mayr

People with the name

Given name
Telemaco Arcangeli (1923-1998), Italian racewalker
Telemaco Ruggeri (1876–1957), Italian actor and film director
Telemaco Signorini (1835–1901), Italian artist
Telémaco Susini (1856-1936), Argentinian physician

Surname
Amaury Telemaco (1974), Dominican baseball player
Pedro Telemaco (1968), Puerto Rican actor

See also
 Telemachus (disambiguation)
 Telemaque (disambiguation)

Italian masculine given names